The Eastern Connecticut Conference (also known as the ECC) serves high schools in Windham County and New London County.

History

In 2015 the ECC was in danger of falling apart when seven schools applied to the NCCC conference. The four large schools, Ledyard, New London, Fitch and East Lyme announced that they would be leaving the ECC and forming a new conference named the Southeastern Connecticut Athletic Conference. During that same time five other schools, Bacon Academy, Waterford, Montville, Wheeler and Stonington applied to join the shoreline conference. For Ice hockey, Fitch, Bacon Academy, East Lyme, Griswold, Hale Ray, Killingly, Ledyard, Montville, Norwich Free Academy, Stonington, Waterford & Wheeler make up the coop team of the Eastern CT Eagles.

Schools

Fall sports
Field Hockey
Volleyball
Soccer
Football
Swimming (girls)
Cross Country

Winter sports
Basketball
Fencing
Wrestling
Swimming (boys)
Indoor Track
Ice Hockey
Cheerleading

Spring sports
Baseball
Softball
Tennis
Lacrosse
Outdoor Track
Golf

References

External links
 

High school sports conferences and leagues in the United States
Sports in Connecticut